Mathias Wichmann Andersen (born 6 August 1991 in Gug, Aalborg) is a Danish footballer who plays as a midfielder for Jerv. His main assets is his vision, ability to keep the ball and using his technique.

Honours

Club
AaB
Danish Superliga (1): 2013–14
Danish Cup (1): 2013–14

References

External links

Guardian Football

1991 births
Living people
Danish men's footballers
AaB Fodbold players
Viborg FF players
FK Jerv players
Danish Superliga players
Norwegian First Division players
Eliteserien players
Denmark under-21 international footballers
Association football midfielders
Danish expatriate men's footballers
Expatriate footballers in Norway
Danish expatriate sportspeople in Norway
Sportspeople from Aalborg